The StarPhoenix is a daily newspaper that serves Saskatoon, Saskatchewan, Canada, and is a part of Postmedia Network. The StarPhoenix puts out six editions each week and publishes one weekly, Bridges. It is also part of the canada.com web portal.

History 
The StarPhoenix was first published as The Saskatoon Phoenix on October 17, 1902 (following a short-lived attempt at a local newspaper, the Saskatoon Sentinel). In 1909, it became a daily paper and, in 1910, was renamed the Saskatoon Capital.

The paper was sold and bought several times between its inception and the 1920s, at one point being owned by W. F. Herman, the future owner and publisher of the Windsor Star.

By 1927, there were two daily papers in Saskatoon: the Saskatoon Daily Star and the Daily Phoenix. In January 1928, both papers were bought by the Sifton family of Winnipeg and amalgamated into the Saskatoon Star-Phoenix. In the early 1980s the spelling of the newspaper name was modified to StarPhoenix. Between the 1928 amalgamation and the launch of the Saskatoon edition of Metro in April 2012, the StarPhoenix was the city's only daily newspaper.

In 1996, the StarPhoenix was bought by the Hollinger newspaper chain. It was subsequently sold to CanWest Global Communications in 2000 and became part of its Southam Newspapers division, later called  the CanWest News Service. CanWest was acquired by Postmedia News, Inc., which is the current owner of The StarPhoenix.

In 2015, the StarPhoenix press began printing the Regina Leader-Post, in addition to its own print edition, after the Leader-Post's own press was shut down. In 2023, Postmedia announced that the StarPhoenix press would be shut down and the building be put up for sale. Both the StarPhoenix and Leader-Post were to continue publication, but printed at facility in Estevan. The reporting staff, working from home since March 2020 at the beginning of the COVID-19 pandemic, were to continue doing so on a permanent basis.

Circulation 
Like most Canadian daily newspapers, The StarPhoenix has seen a decline in circulation. Its total circulation dropped by  percent to 39,008 copies daily from 2009 to 2015.

Daily average

See also 
List of newspapers in Canada

References

External links 
 

Newspapers published in Saskatoon
Postmedia Network publications
Daily newspapers published in Saskatchewan